Cleandridas or Cleandrides (Greek: Κλεανδρίδας or Κλεανδρίδης) was a Spartan general of the 5th century BCE, who advised the young Agiad king Pleistoanax during the early part of the latter's reign.  According to Plutarch, both Cleandrides and Pleistoanax were banished from Sparta (most likely between the years 446 and 444 BC), for allegedly accepting a bribe from the Athenian leader Pericles to call off their planned attack on the Athenian region Attica. Although Pleistoanax was later recalled to Sparta, Cleandrides had a death sentence imposed upon him in his absence. (Plutarch, Life of Pericles XXII)

Ancient Spartan generals
5th-century BC Spartans
Ephors